John Parmenter Robarts  (January 11, 1917 – October 18, 1982) was a Canadian lawyer and politician who served as the 17th premier of Ontario from 1961 to 1971. He was a member of the Progressive Conservative Party of Ontario.

Early life
Robarts was born in Banff, Alberta, to Herbert Roberts and Ellen Florence May Robarts, making him the only Ontario premier not to have been born in Ontario. As a young man, he moved to London, Ontario, with his family, where he studied at Central Collegiate (today, London Central Secondary School) and at the University of Western Ontario (UWO) in business administration. While attending UWO, he joined the Delta Upsilon fraternity.

Robarts enrolled to study law at Osgoode Hall Law School, but his education was interrupted by service with the Royal Canadian Navy during World War II. After the war, he returned to law school and graduated in 1948.

Early political career
Robarts practiced law in London, Ontario, and was elected to city council in 1948. In 1951, he was elected as a member of provincial parliament (MPP) to the Legislative Assembly of Ontario, as a Progressive Conservative (PC) from the city. In that era, MPPs not in cabinet were essentially working part-time due to relatively light legislative duties. Robarts commuted by train from the Queen's Park legislature in Toronto–the provincial capital–to his family and law practice in London, effectively combining his legislative work with his legal career. His wife Norah disliked Toronto and remained at home in London for most of their marriage. The couple raised two children.

He entered the cabinet of Leslie Frost in 1958 as minister without portfolio, and was promoted to minister of education in 1959. The province was in the midst of a major building phase with its education system, to accommodate an enormous increase in enrollment following the Baby Boomer generation of the post-World War II era, and Robarts played an important role as education minister, with the establishment of new institutions such as York University.

Premier of Ontario
In 1961, Robarts became the 17th premier of Ontario, and served in that capacity until 1971. He was an advocate of individual freedoms, and promoted the rights of the provinces against the centralizing initiatives of the federal government. He also promoted national unity against Quebec separatism, and hosted the 1967 "Confederation of Tomorrow" conference in Toronto in an unsuccessful attempt to achieve an agreement for a new Constitution of Canada.

He initially opposed Canadian Medicare when it was proposed, but later endorsed it fully following New Democratic Party (NDP) candidate Kenneth Bolton's upset by-election victory on the issue in the London-area riding of Middlesex South.

As a civil libertarian, and a strong believer in the promotion of both official languages, Robarts opened the door to French language education in Ontario schools. In 1972 he was made a Companion of the Order of Canada.

Nicknamed "the Chairman of the Board" during his tenure, Robarts is remembered for his steps to promote and improve education. He was responsible for the construction of five new universities including York University, the establishment of the Ontario Science Centre and Ontario Place, the creation of numerous teacher's colleges, the creation of the community college system, the GO Transit commuter rail system, introducing nuclear power to Ontario's electricity grid, and launching the Ontario Scholar fund for high school students graduating with an A average.

Later life
After retiring from office, Robarts co-chaired the Task Force on Canadian Unity with Jean-Luc Pépin, and joined a Toronto law firm as well as the boards of directors of several major corporations.

He served as chancellor of the University of Western Ontario from 1971 to 1976. He served as chancellor of York University from 1977 to 1982.

Robarts and his wife divorced in the early seventies, and he remarried to a woman 28 years his junior.

Robarts died by suicide on October 18, 1982. He had been suffering from depression as a result of the 1977 suicide of his son, Timothy, and a series of debilitating strokes.

He is buried in St. James Cemetery, in Toronto.

Legacy
The Robarts Centre for Canadian Studies at York University was founded in 1984 in his name. The John P. Robarts Research Institute (renamed The Robarts Research Institute in 2005) at the University of Western Ontario was officially opened in 1986. Also in London is the Robarts School for the Deaf, and the John P. Robarts elementary school. The 16-storey John P. Robarts Research Library at the University of Toronto is also named in his honour.
Math & Computer Science Building of University of Waterloo

Biographies
University of Western Ontario professor A. K. McDougall authored the first full-length biography: Robarts, in 1985. Steve Paikin wrote a biography, Public Triumph, Private Tragedy: The Double Life of John P. Robarts (Viking, 2005).

References

External links

 
 
 Reference on John Robarts Death
 John P. Robarts fonds, Archives of Ontario

1917 births
1982 suicides
20th-century Canadian lawyers
Canadian politicians who committed suicide
Canadian King's Counsel
Chancellors of the University of Western Ontario
Chancellors of York University
Companions of the Order of Canada
Lawyers in Ontario
Leaders of the Progressive Conservative Party of Ontario
London, Ontario city councillors
Members of the King's Privy Council for Canada
Osgoode Hall Law School alumni
People from Banff, Alberta
Premiers of Ontario
Progressive Conservative Party of Ontario MPPs
Royal Canadian Navy officers
University of Toronto people
University of Western Ontario alumni
Burials at St. James Cemetery, Toronto
1982 deaths